Edward Mackay "Eddie" Cheever III (born 5 June 1993) is an Italian-American racing driver who competes in the FIA World Endurance Championship for MR Racing in the LMGTE Am class. He is the son of retired Formula One driver Eddie Cheever.

Career

Karting
Born in Rome, Cheever began karting in 2006 and raced primarily in Europe for the majority of his karting career, working his way up from the junior ranks to progress through to the KF2 category by 2009 and finishing 15th in the CIK-FIA European Championship.

Formula Renault
Cheever graduated to single-seaters in 2009. He competed with Jenzer Motorsport in the Swiss and Italian championships, finishing eleventh and fourteenth in the final standings, respectively.

Formula Abarth
In 2010, Cheever moved into the newly launched Formula Abarth series in Italy, staying with Jenzer Motorsport. He achieved a podium in the sprint race at Varano and finished the season eleventh.

Italian Formula Three
In 2011, Cheever joined Lucidi Motors for a campaign in the Italian Formula Three Championship. He finished ninth with podiums at Misano, Adria and Mugello.

He remained in the series in 2012 but switched to Prema Powerteam. He finished as runner-up to Riccardo Agostini in both the European and Italian championship formats.

Formula One
On 9 November 2012, Cheever tested a Scuderia Ferrari Formula One car at Vallelunga, as a result of his performance in the Italian Formula Three Championship.

FIA Formula 3 European Championship
Cheever continued his collaboration with Prema Powerteam in FIA European Formula 3 Championship in 2013.

NASCAR 
In 2014, Cheever made the switch from open wheel to stock cars, running the NASCAR Whelen Euro Series for Italian-based CAAL Racing, scoring his first win and his first pole position at Brands Hatch. He then won two more races, at Magione and Le Mans, to finish the season third in points. He won the Jerome Sarran Trophy, rewarding the highest-placed driver aged 25 or under, and the Race And Win Pole Award, rewarding the driver scoring the highest number of pole positions during the season.

On 4 August 2015, Cheever announced that he would make his K&N Pro Series East debut at Watkins Glen International for Bill McAnally Racing. He also ran one race in K&N Pro Series West at All American Speedway, also for Bill McAnally Racing.

Sports car racing 
Cheever has been a long-time member of Sky - Tempesta Racing, alongside Chris Froggatt and Jonathan Hui. In 2023, the team began partnering with Garage 59 and switched to driving the McLaren 720S GT3 in the GT World Challenge Europe.

Racing record

Career summary

* Season still in progress.

Complete FIA Formula 3 European Championship results
(key)

NASCAR
(key) (Bold – Pole position awarded by qualifying time. Italics – Pole position earned by points standings or practice time. * – Most laps led.)

Whelen Euro Series - Elite 1

Complete IMSA Sportscar Championship results

Complete FIA World Endurance Championship results
(key) (Races in bold indicate pole position; races in italics indicate fastest lap)

Complete 24 Hours of Le Mans results

Complete GT World Challenge Europe Sprint Cup results
(key) (Races in bold indicate pole position) (Races in italics indicate fastest lap)

* Season still in progress.

References

External links
  
 
 

1993 births
Living people
Italian people of American descent
Racing drivers from Rome
Italian racing drivers
Formula Renault 2.0 Alps drivers
Italian Formula Renault 2.0 drivers
Formula Abarth drivers
Italian Formula Three Championship drivers
FIA Formula 3 European Championship drivers
NASCAR drivers
WeatherTech SportsCar Championship drivers
24 Hours of Daytona drivers
FIA World Endurance Championship drivers
24 Hours of Le Mans drivers
International GT Open drivers
24H Series drivers
Prema Powerteam drivers
Blancpain Endurance Series drivers
Jenzer Motorsport drivers
AF Corse drivers
Le Mans Cup drivers